Kuwait participated in the 1974 Asian Games held in Tehran, Iran from 1 to 16 September 1974. Athletes from Kuwait won only one medal and finished 18th in a medal table.

References

Nations at the 1974 Asian Games
1974
Asian Games